Hans Mössmer (born 22 March 1932) is an Austrian ice hockey player. He competed in the men's tournament at the 1956 Winter Olympics.

References

1932 births
Living people
Austrian ice hockey players
Olympic ice hockey players of Austria
Ice hockey players at the 1956 Winter Olympics
Sportspeople from Innsbruck